Mendham, New Jersey may refer to:

 Mendham Township, New Jersey, a township in Morris County, New Jersey, US
 Mendham Borough, New Jersey, a borough in Morris County, New Jersey, US